William Joseph McCarren (November 4, 1895 – September 11, 1983) was a professional baseball third baseman, who played for the Brooklyn Robins of Major League Baseball (MLB), in .

Baseball career
Born in Fortenia, Pennsylvania, McCarren had a brief big league baseball career, appearing in 69 games — mostly at third base — for the National League (NL) Brooklyn Robins, in 1923. He made his MLB debut on May 4, 1923.

In 1918, McCarren began his pro baseball career, playing Minor League Baseball (MiLB) for Newark of the International League. In , his final MiLB campaign, Mccarren played for Montreal of the International League. He retired from active play, following the season.

After McCarren’s playing days ended, he was employed by Jersey City, New Jersey, serving as the groundskeeper of the high school’s athletic field.

Professional scouting
Some years afterward, McCarren began scouting for the Boston Red Sox. Several of the players he signed made it to MLB; among them are Dick Brodowski, Mickey McDermott, and Leo Kiely. McCarren left baseball for good, following the 1969 season.

Death
McCarren died on September 11, 1983, in Denver, Colorado.

References

External links

1895 births
1983 deaths
Baseball players from Pennsylvania
Boston Red Sox scouts
Bridgeport Americans players
Bridgeport Bears (baseball) players
Brooklyn Robins players
Buffalo Bisons (minor league) players
Jersey City Skeeters players
Major League Baseball third basemen
Montreal Royals players
Newark Bears (IL) players
Oakland Oaks (baseball) players
Rochester Tribe players
People from Wayne County, Pennsylvania